Baltic Basketball League 2011–12 season was a basketball competition among Baltic states basketball clubs. The season started on 30 September 2011.

Teams

Elite Division

† Promoted from the 2010–11 Challenge Cup^ Qualified directly to playoffs

Challenge Cup

Elite Division

Regular season

Play-offs

Quarterfinals
Žalgiris vs. Rūdupis
 

Šiauliai vs. Triumph Lyubertsy

VEF Riga vs. Kalev/Cramo

Lietuvos Rytas vs. Ventspils

Semifinals

Third place match

Final

Player Statistics 

Efficiency

Points

Rebounds

Assists

Challenge Cup

Regular season

Group A

Group B

Play-offs

References

External links
 
 Eurobasket.com League Page

Baltic Basketball League seasons
2011–12 in European basketball leagues
2011–12 in Lithuanian basketball
2011–12 in Estonian basketball
2011–12 in Latvian basketball
2011–12 in Russian basketball
2011–12 in Kazakhstani basketball